Kristina Herbst (born 24 August 1977 in Bremen, Germany) is a German Politician of the Christian Democratic Union (CDU) and current President of the Landtag of Schleswig-Holstein.

Personal Life and Education 
Herbst has three children.

Career 
Kristina Herbst used to be State Secretary to the Schleswig-Holstein Ministry of the Interior, Rural Areas, Integration and Equality, serving under Minister Sabine Sütterlin-Waack as part of the cabinet of Daniel Günther.

She was elected President of the Landtag of Schleswig-Holstein on 7 June 2022 and subsequently resigned her post as State Secretary.

References 

Members of the Landtag of Schleswig-Holstein
Living people
1977 births
Christian Democratic Union of Germany MEPs
21st-century German women politicians
Women members of State Parliaments in Germany